Teaca is a commune in Bistrița-Năsăud County, Transylvania, Romania. It is composed of six villages: Archiud, Budurleni, Ocnița, Pinticu, Teaca and Viile Tecii.

References

Communes in Bistrița-Năsăud County
Localities in Transylvania